Carles Cuadrat Xiqués (born 28 October 1968) is a Spanish football manager, who currently assistant manager at Danish Superliga club FC Midtjylland. A former player, Cuadrat played as a left-defender for FC Barcelona reserves as well as the Spanish youth teams.

Playing career
Born in Barcelona, Catalonia, Cuadrat played for various clubs in the Spanish second division. He joined La Masia at age of ten in 1978. He played for all the FC Barcelona youth teams between 1978 and 1988. Cuadrat was also part of the FC Barcelona side that won the U19 Spanish Cup in 1986 and 1987. In 1988, Cuadrat played for FC Barcelona's first team in couple of friendlies under then head coach Luis Aragones alongside the likes of Gary Lineker and Bernd Schuster at the Camp Nou. He played fourteen times for Spanish national youth teams (U15 & U18) during his youth years most notably finishing third in the 1985 UEFA European Under-16 Championship.

Cuadrat played for Catalonian clubs FC Barcelona B, CF Gavà and CE Sabadell in Segunda División B between 1988 and 1998. With his playing career cut short by injury in 1998 at the age of 30, Cuadrat began working as a Physical Coach for the FC Barcelona Youth Academy.

Coaching career
During his second stint as a player at CF Gavà he also worked as director at CF Gava Youth Academy between 1995 and 1998. In 1998 he joined the FC Barcelona under–15 team as assistant and physical coach under Albert Benaiges. He worked as coach and physical trainer for various FC Barcelona youth teams in years followed.

In 2009 Cuadrat joined former FC Barcelona manager Frank Rijkaard's technical staff as Physical trainer at the Turkish giants Galatasaray. He was also in the technical staff Rijkaard at Saudi Arabia between 2011 and 2013.

In 2014, when Albert Roca, who was assistant coach to Frank Rijkaard at Galatasaray and Saudi Arabia, became manager of El Salvador, he enlisted service of Cuadrat as assistant coach.

He moved to then I-League side Bengaluru FC, who moved to the Indian Super League in 2017, with Roca in 2016 as an assistant coach. During his two-year stint, the club won the Federation Cup in 2017, Super Cup in 2018 apart from being the first Indian side to reach the AFC Cup final in 2016.

On 29 December 2017 Carles Cuadrat parted ways with the club by mutual consent owing to health concerns.

After Albert Roca's departure as head coach at the end of 2017–18 season, Bengaluru FC appointed Cuadrat as head coach for 2018–19 season. He led them to their maiden Indian Super League title in his first season as head coach. Having won the 2018–19 Indian Super League final 1–0 against FC Goa, Cuadrat's Bengaluru FC side became the only team in the history of the League to have finished in first place in the regular league and win the title in the same year.

In 2019–20, Cuadrat took the team back to the playoffs in the Indian Super League for a third consecutive season, being the only club in the Indian Super League to reach the playoff in every appearance. The feat also made Bengaluru FC the first team to reach the playoff as defending champions, since ATK in the 2015–16 edition of the tournament. Defending champions had failed to make it to the top four the following season, with ATK (in 2015) and Bengaluru FC (in 2020) the only teams to do so.

However, it was ATK that stopped Bengaluru's charge to the final with an aggregate win of 3–2 in the playoffs. The Kolkata side would go on to claim the title, winning 3–1 against Chennaiyin FC in the final.

Under Cuadrat, Bengaluru has set many Indian Super League and club records:

 In 2018–19, an 11-match unbeaten run made Bengaluru FC the team with the longest unbeaten streak in the Indian Super League.
 In 2018–19, Bengaluru FC won six matches in a row, another feat unmatched in the Indian Super League.
 Gurpreet Singh Sandhu's 11 clean sheets in 2019–20 means that Bengaluru hold the League record for most clean sheets in a single season.
 From December 2017 to December 2019, Bengaluru went a League-record 17 matches unbeaten at the Sree Kanteerava Stadium, the longest such run in the Indian Super League.
 Cuadrat's BFC side went 385 minutes without conceding a goal at home, with FC Goa's 61st-minute strike on 3 January followed by ATK's 86th-minute goal on 22 February, over a run of four League games.
 Bengaluru FC's biggest ever win was recorded under Carles Cuadrat in the 2019–20 campaign when the Blues beat Paro FC 9–1 at the Kanteerava in the AFC Cup qualifiers.

On 6 January 2021, it was announced that Carles Cuadrat and Bengaluru FC have parted ways on mutual consent.

In 2021–2022 season he joined the recently promoted Aris Limassol (founded in 1930) of Cyprus, achieving with the team best season of their history, qualifying for the first time for the play-off for the Title and getting a place in UEFA European competition also for the first time in the history of the club.

References

External links

Carles Cuadrat website

1968 births
Living people
Sportspeople from Sabadell
Spanish footballers
Footballers from Barcelona
Association football defenders
Segunda División B players
Tercera División players
FC Barcelona C players
CF Gavà players
CE Sabadell FC footballers
Spanish football managers
Indian Super League head coaches
Bengaluru FC head coaches
Spanish expatriate football managers
Expatriate football managers in India